In mathematics, and especially general topology, the interlocking interval topology is an example of a topology on the set , i.e. the set of all positive real numbers that are not positive whole numbers. To give the set S a topology means to say which subsets of S are "open", and to do so in a way that the following axioms are met:

 The union of open sets is an open set.
 The finite intersection of open sets is an open set.
 S and the empty set ∅ are open sets.

Construction 

The open sets in this topology are taken to be the whole set S, the empty set ∅, and the sets generated by

The sets generated by Xn will be formed by all possible unions of finite intersections of the Xn.

See also 

 List of topologies

References 

 

General topology
Topological spaces